The 1989 Star World Championships were held in Porto Cervo, Italy in 1989.

Results

References

Star World Championships
1989 in sailing
Sailing competitions in Italy